Adriaan Engelvaart  (30 June 1812, Looperskapelle – 3 February 1893, The Hague) was a Dutch military commander and politician.

See also
List of Dutch politicians

1812 births
1893 deaths
Royal Netherlands Army generals
Royal Netherlands Army personnel
Ministers of Defence of the Netherlands
People from Schouwen-Duiveland